Castello Mio is a brand of Sambuca liqueur owned and produced by Castle Brands Inc. Described as “super premium,” Castello Mio is distilled in Veneto, Italy by a family company that has been in business since the 1800s.

It has an ABV of 38%.

Flavors
Castello Mio Classico is available in the traditional Sambuca flavor of anise, herbs and spices. The brand also produces an Espresso flavor, which combines Sambuca with espresso made from real Italian roast coffee beans.

Tasting Notes
Classico: Clear. Mild red licorice, white pepper, and white chocolate aromas with a soft, mildly sweet light-to-medium body and a creamy anise and nut oil finish. Different and subtle.
Espresso: Dark chestnut brown color. Aromas of espresso candy, dried fruit, and faint licorice with a supple, dryish medium body and a nice dance of coffee and anise flavors on the lightly warming finish.

Reviews
Castello Mio Classico received a rating of 86 from the Beverage Tasting Institute in 2013. Castello Mio Espresso received a 90 in the same tasting.

References

External links
Castle Brands website

Italian liqueurs